Baljit Singh s/o Charun Singh (born 22 September 1986) is a field hockey player from Ipoh, Perak, Malaysia.

Baljit joined TNB in 2004 and helped them to three overall titles in the MHL, in 2004, 2007 and 2009. He made his senior international debut at the 2007 Sultan Azlan Shah Cup.

In 2008 Baljit played for Zehlendorfer Wespen in the German league with another Malaysian, Selvaraju Sandrakasi. The German Division Two club gave him an invitation again in 2009 and 2010 but he was unable to accept it because of commitments with the national team.

References

1986 births
Living people
Malaysian Sikhs
Malaysian sportspeople of Indian descent
Malaysian people of Punjabi descent
People from Ipoh
Malaysian male field hockey players
Asian Games medalists in field hockey
Field hockey players at the 2010 Asian Games
Asian Games silver medalists for Malaysia
Medalists at the 2010 Asian Games
Southeast Asian Games gold medalists for Malaysia
Southeast Asian Games medalists in field hockey
Competitors at the 2013 Southeast Asian Games
Field hockey players at the 2006 Commonwealth Games
Commonwealth Games competitors for Malaysia